Xining is a town under the administration of Leibo County, Sichuan, China. , it administers the following three residential communities and 14 villages:
Neighborhoods
Xining Community
Leimaping Tea Plantation Community
Leibo Forestry Bureau Community

Villages
Xining Village
Lijiaping Village
Tongmuxi Village
Tuan'erbu Village
Shichangwan Village
Shashaping Village
Shiziyan Village
Yinchanggou Village
Da'ao Village
Guanghui Village
Shatuo Village
Fuzi Village
Tuotian Village
Zhaojiashan Village

References 
 

 

Towns in Sichuan
Leibo County